Caroline Häcki-Rindlisbacher (born 4 October 1982 in Zurich) is a Swiss dressage rider. Representing Switzerland, she competed at the 2014 World Equestrian Games  and the 2018 FEI World Equestrian Games and at two European Dressage Championships (in 2013 and 2015).

Her current best championship result is 9th place in team dressage at the 2013 Europeans held in Herning while her current best individual result is 39th place from the same championships.

References

External links
 

Living people
1982 births
Swiss female equestrians
Swiss dressage riders
Sportspeople from Zürich